John Somerville (born 1951), attended Woodhouse Grammar School and Barnet College in north London. He studied Fine Art Bronze Casting under David Reid (Leverhulme Fellowship, Central St Martin's School of Art) and opened his first bronze studio in 1979.

He has had numerous one-man shows in the UK, Europe and the United States. He exhibits regularly at the Royal Academy Summer Exhibition. His work appears regularly at Christie's and Sotheby's auction houses in London and New York. Commissions include rock stars in bronze for the Hard Rock Cafes in New York, Houston, Los Angeles, Hawaii and Reykjavík; public monuments and commemorative busts.

In 2016 John completed a statue of Spike Milligan sitting on a bench for Avenue House Estate Trust at Stephens House and Gardens in Finchley, which is the product of over ten years of work and fundraising by the Finchley Society.

References

1951 births
Place of birth missing (living people)
Living people
20th-century British sculptors
British male sculptors
21st-century British sculptors
21st-century male artists
20th-century British male artists
21st-century British male artists